Margan-e Vasat (also Romanized as Margan-e Vasaţ) is a village in Qarah Quyun-e Jonubi Rural District, Qarah Quyun District, Showt County, West Azerbaijan Province, Iran. At the 2006 census, its population was 564, in 130 families. After the census, the villages of Margan-e Azizabad, Margan-e Esmail Kandi, Margan-e Qadim, and Margan-e Vasat merged to form the new city of Marganlar.

References 

Populated places in Showt County